Óscar Manuel Cortés Cortés (born 3 December 2003) is a Colombian professional footballer currently playing as a midfielder for Categoría Primera A club Millonarios.

Cortés is a Colombia youth international, having represented his nation at the 2023 South American U-20 Championship.

Club career

Millonarios
Born in Tumaco, Cortés progressed through the academy of Millonarios, making his debut in the 2022 season. He signed his first professional contract in May of the same year. 

On January 12, 2022, Cortés made his debut for Millonarios' first team in the opening match of the Apertura against Deportivo Pasto. He came on as a substitute in the 89th minute for Macalister Silva in a match that ended with Millonarios winning 1–0. In February, Cortés formed part of Millonario's under-20 squad, which competed at the 2022 U-20 Copa Libertadores. On 12 May, he scored his first professional goal in a second-leg Copa Colombia match against Jaguares de Córdoba, contributing to Millonarios' 1–1 tie in the game and aiding the team in advancing to the quarter-finals 4–1 on aggregate.

After an impressive performance for Colombia at the 2023 South American U-20 Championship, Cortés drew the attention of Serie A club Torino, who have been linked with a potential move for the player. Upon his return to Millonarios, Cortés scored his first brace for the club on February 18th during a league match against Jaguares. His performances contributed to Millonarios' 2–1 home victory, securing three important points for the team. On 2 March, a remarkable display by Cortés played a pivotal role in Millonarios' victory over Ecuadorian side Universidad Católica in the second round of the 2023 Copa Libertadores. Cortés' contribution included assisting Millonario's equalizing goal and creating the game-winning play that ultimately secured a 2–1 aggregate victory for Millonarios, advancing them to the third round of the tournament to face Brazilian powerhouse Atlético Mineiro.

International career

Youth
Cortés has represented Colombia at under-20 level. He starred at the 2023 South American U-20 Championship as Colombia finished third, helping his team qualify to the 2023 FIFA U-20 World Cup in Indonesia and the 2023 Pan American Games in Santiago. With three goals to his name, he emerged as Colombia's leading scorer in the tournament, thanks to his brace against Peru in the group stage and a goal he scored during Colombia's impressive 3–0 victory over Paraguay in the final stage.

Career statistics

Club

References

2003 births
Living people
People from Tumaco
Sportspeople from Nariño Department
Colombian footballers
Colombia youth international footballers
Association football midfielders
Categoría Primera A players
Millonarios F.C. players